Décryptage is a 2003 documentary written by Jacques Tarnero and directed by Philippe Bensoussan.  The French film (with English subtitles) examines media coverage of the Arab–Israeli conflict in the media of France, and concludes that the media's presentation of the Arab–Israeli conflict in France is consistently skewed against Israel and may be responsible for exacerbating antisemitism.

See also

 Media coverage of the Arab-Israeli conflict
 Pallywood
 Peace, Propaganda, and the Promised Land
 Relentless: The Struggle for Peace in the Middle East
 Deception: Betraying the Peace Process

References

External links

Film Review by CAMERA

French documentary films
2003 films
2000s French-language films
2003 documentary films
Documentary films about journalism
Documentary films about the Arab–Israeli conflict
Documentary films about racism
Documentary films about Jews and Judaism
Antisemitism in France
2000s French films